Jasper Park may refer to:

 Jasper National Park, the largest national park in the Canadian Rockies
 Jasper Park, Edmonton, a neighborhood in west Edmonton, Alberta, Canada
  a World War 2 cargo ship, sank in the war by U-boat

See also
 Jasper (disambiguation)